Classic Kids is a compilation album of classical music compiled by Stephen McGhee. It was released in 1992 by the Australian Broadcasting Corporation and was subtitled A Fun Way for Children to Enjoy the Classics. Whilst sometimes credited to ABC Symphony Orchestra, it was recorded by various Australian orchestras, conductors and soloists. A 68-page teachers guide was available with the album. The album won the ARIA Award for Best Children's Album in 1993.

Track listing
William Tell overture
1. Finale (Gioachino Rossini)

Nutcracker
2. March (Pyotr Ilyich Tchaikovsky)
3. Trepak (Tchaikovsky)
4. Flight of the bumble bee (Nikolai Rimsky-Korsakov)
 
Snugglepot and Cuddlepie
5. Mrs Kookaburra (Richard Mills) 
6. Perpetum mobile (Johann Strauss II) 
7. Seven little Australians (Bruce Smeaton) 
8. The Washington Post (John Philip Sousa) 
9. Dance of the toy flutes (Tchaikovsky)

Carnival of the animals
10. The swan (Camille Saint-Saëns)
11. The elephant (Saint-Saëns)

Eight Russian folk songs
12. I danced with a mosquito (Anatoly Liadov)

Comedians
13. Gallop (Dmitry Kabalevsky)

The nutcracker
14. Dance of the sugar plum fairy (Tchaikovsky)

Nursery suite
15. The merry doll (Edward Elgar) 
16. Shepherd's hey (Percy Grainger)

Ballet suite no. 1
17. Dance (Dmitry Shostakovich)

Romeo & Juliet
18. The street awakens (Sergei Prokofiev)
19. Radetsky march (Johann Strauss I)
20. Show people (Carl Davis)

Personnel
Orchestras
Melbourne Symphony Orchestra
Queensland Symphony Orchestra
Sydney Symphony Orchestra
Tasmanian Symphony Orchestra
West Australian Symphony Orchestra

Conductors
Werner Andreas Albert 
Myer Fredman
Peter Grunberg
John Hopkins  
Richard Mills 
Roland Peelman 
Vladimir Ponkin 
Shalom Ronly-Riklis 
Albert Rosen
Bruce Smeaton

Musicians
Anthony Baldwin (Piano)  
David Bollard (Piano)
David Pereira (Cello)  
Walter Sutcliffe (Double Bass)

References

Compilation albums by Australian artists
1992 compilation albums
ARIA Award-winning albums